Sir Caesar Hawkins, 1st Baronet (1711–1786) was a surgeon and baronet.

Hawkins was a surgeon in St. George's Hospital from 1736 to 1774. He was a sergeant-surgeon to George II and George III of Great Britain and Ireland. He was created the first of the Hawkins baronets in 1778. He invented the cutting gorget.

References

External links
 https://www.oxforddnb.com/view/10.1093/ref:odnb/9780198614128.001.0001/odnb-9780198614128-e-12661

1711 births
1786 deaths
Baronets in the Baronetage of Great Britain
English surgeons